James Thomas Lee (12 April 1892 – 1955) was a footballer who played in the Football League for Aston Villa and Stoke.

Career
Lee was born in Brierley Hill and played for Cradley Heath and Wulfrunians before joining Aston Villa in 1919. He played 18 times for Villa in two seasons and left for Stoke in 1921. At Stoke he shared goalkeeping duties with Tom Kay and Percy Knott in 1921–22 with Lee playing in 24 matches but he deemed surplus to requirements at the end of the season and was allowed to join Macclesfield.

Career statistics
Source:

References

1892 births
1955 deaths
People from Brierley Hill
English footballers
Association football goalkeepers
Cradley Heath F.C. players
Aston Villa F.C. players
Stoke City F.C. players
Macclesfield Town F.C. players
English Football League players